Pyropteron aistleitneri is a moth of the family Sesiidae. It is found in Spain (Andalusia).

References

Moths described in 1992
Sesiidae